Syverson is a surname. Notable people with the surname include:

Dave Syverson (born 1957), American politician
Henry Syverson or Hank Syverson (1918–2007), American cartoonist and illustrator
Jon Syverson (born 1980), American musician
Paul Syverson, mathematician who co-developed onion routing